The women's 1500 metres at the 1999 Asian Winter Games was held on January 31, 1999 at Yongpyong Indoor Ice Rink, South Korea.

Schedule
All times are Korea Standard Time (UTC+09:00)

Results
Legend
DSQ — Disqualified

Heats

Heat 1

Heat 2

Heat 3

Final

References

Heats
Finals

External links
Official website

Women 1500